The flag and the coat of arms of Johor are state symbols of Johor, Malaysia. Like other states of Malaysia with Malay royalties, the state symbols of Johor are influenced by Johor's royalties, as well as Islam and the political and natural features of the state.

Flag

Design 
Johor's state flag bears a canton pattern, a predominantly navy blue design with a bright red field on the upper left canton (quarter), which contains a white crescent and a white five-pointed star. Running slightly less than half the length of the flag, the field unconventionally occupies roughly three fifths of the flag's hoist. In addition, the crescent is not aligned upright, tilting to the right towards the lower fly end and wrapping slightly around the star, which is positioned towards the lower right corner of the field.

The flag in general attempts to symbolise Johor as a whole. The navy blue, which occupies roughly three quarters of the flag, represents the universe, or the state government. The red represents the warriors that defend the state, while the white crescent and white star denote Islam and Johor's sovereign ruler, respectively.

Variants 
The vast majority of flags in use or formerly used by officials and government branches in the state borrow elements of the state flag, some of which are merely recolours. With the introduction of a unified state flag, many of them became obsolete, with the exception of the Royal Standards.

Standards 
A series of Royal Standards are flown by the Sultan of Johor and his family, which lower-ranking members are assigned specific Standards. In addition, standards were also adopted for traditional high-ranking officials, including the bendahara, the Temenggung and the Sultan's Marshall.

The Standards are typically plain flags with a star (of varying numbers of points) and crescent, with truncating triangles placed on each corner of the flag; only the Standards of the Sultan and the Crown Prince are depicted without the truncations. In addition, each flag, with the exception of the Sultan's Enquerries, are coloured in only two colours, including white, blue, red and yellow. The number of points on the star also determines the rank of the Standard holder: The Sultan's Standard depicts a nine-pointed star, while the Standard for other members of the royal family depicts a five-pointed star.

The series of Standards include:
 the Standard of the Sultan: (Bendera Duli Yang Maha Mulia Baginda Sultan) A white flag with a blue nine-pointed star and crescent;
 the Standard of the Permaisuri: (Bendera Duli Yang Maha Mulia Baginda Permaisuri) A blue flag with a white seven-pointed star and crescent and four white triangles on each corner;
 the Standard of the Crown Prince: (Bendera Duli Yang Amat Mulia Tunku Mahkota) A white flag with a red seven-pointed star and crescent;
 the Standard of the Bendahara: (Bendera Yang Amat Mulia Tunku Bendahara) A white flag with a red five-pointed star and crescent and four red triangles on each corner;
 the Standard of the Temenggong: (Bendera Yang Amat Mulia Tunku Temenggong) Yellow flag with blue five-pointed star and crescent and four blue triangles on each corner;
 the Standard of the Laksamana: (Bendera Yang Amat Mulia Tunku Laksamana) Blue flag with yellow five-pointed star and crescent and four yellow triangles on each corner;
the Standard of the Panglima: (Bendera Yang Amat Mulia Tunku Panglima) Blue flag with red five-pointed star and crescent and four red triangles on each corner;
the Standard of the Putera: (Bendera Yang Amat Mulia Tunku Putera) Red flag with blue five-pointed star and crescent and four blue triangles on each corner;
the Standard of the Sultan's Equerries: (Bendera Pengiring Raja) Black field with red canton containing a five-pointed white star and crescent, similar to the civil flag and ensign, but features a swallowtail that extends close to canton; and
 the Standard for other members of the royal family: (Bendera Kerabat Diraja) A yellow flag with a blue five-pointed star and crescent.

Governmental flags 
As of 1939, flags were flown by numerous state officials in Johor, including the governing heads of state or district. The vast majority of flag consist of only a plain coloured flag with a five-pointed star and crescent similar to that from the state flag, with some divided diagonally a la party per bend. They include:
 the flag of the Regent of Johor: (Bendera Pemangku Raja) A yellow-blue per bend divided flag with a red five-pointed star and crescent in the centre;
 the flag of the Chief Minister of Johor: (Bendera Menteri Besar) A blue flag with a white five-pointed star and crescent in the centre;
 the Military flag: (Bendera Askar) A blue flag with yellow canton containing a red five-pointed star and crescent, and a white crossed kris and sword on the lower fly;
 the Commercial flag: (Bendera Perniagaan) A black flag with a red canton containing a white five-pointed star and crescent;
 the Marine flag: (Bendera Jabatan Laut) A white flag with blue canton containing a red five-pointed star and crescent;
 the Police flag: (Bendera Polis) A red flag with black canton containing a white five-pointed star and crescent;
 the State Ceremonial Flag: (Bendera Istiadat Kerajaan) A red flag with a white five-pointed star and crescent, and a yellow and blue bordure.
 the Marine Jack (Bendera Tetunggal Jabatan Laut) A blue flag with a red five-pointed star and crescent, and a white bordure.
 the Territorial Government Boat Ensign (Bendera Tetunggal Kapal Kerajaan) A black flag with red canton containing a white five-pointed star and crescent, and a red lozenge containing a white five-pointed star and crescent on the lower fly;
 the Government Official Pennant (Bendera Pegawai Kerajaan) A blue pennant containing a white five-pointed star and crescent;

 the flag of the State Commissioner for Muar: (Bendera Pesuruhjaya Kerajaan bagi Muar) An orthogonally quartered flag with the first quarter coloured red with a white five-pointed star and crescent, the second and third quarters coloured black, and the fourth quarter coloured yellow with a red five-pointed star and crescent; formerly Flag of the State Commissioner for Muar; now has been re-introduced back as Muar Flag by the Muar District Office.
 the flag of the State Commissioner for Batu Pahat: (Bendera Pesuruhjaya Kerajaan bagi Batu Pahat) A red-black per bend divided flag with a white five-pointed star and crescent in the centre; and
 the flag of the State Commissioner for Segamat: (Bendera Pesuruhjaya Kerajaan bagi Segamat) A red-white per bend divided flag with a yellow five-pointed star and crescent in the centre.

In addition, pennants were known to be flown, illustrated as a triangular flag containing the same five pointed star and crescent. The "State Officials' Pennant" was coloured blue with a white star and crescent, while another variant of unknown use was coloured yellow with a blue star and crescent.

District flags 
Johor has ten administrative districts (daerah), each assigned their own district-level flags. They were introduced on 3 March 2015.

Although Simpang Renggam is not yet a district of Johor, the Simpang Renggam District Council flys its flag. The Johor Bahru City Council also owns its flag too.

Obsolete state flag 
The Johorean flag is known to date back as early as the 1850s, when a flag that consisted of a simple black flag with a white canton shaped as a square was flown by the Sultanate between 1855 and 1865. The design was also adopted by Trumong, in present-day Indonesia.

Coat of arms 

Johor's coat of arms (Malay: Jata Johor) derives its layout heavily from Western heraldry, consisting of a central shield topped by a Crown, sided by two supporters, and includes a compartment and motto at the bottom. Details of the arms' elements are:

Crown
The crown represents Johor's royalty, and is symbolised by a blue and yellow adorned with motives of a five-pointed star and a crescent.

Escutcheon
The arms' escutcheon consists of a white shield of an "English" outline with a central five-pointed star and crescent, and four smaller five-pointed stars at each corner of the shield; both the stars and the crescent are coloured in yellow. The larger star and crescent symbolise the Islamic faith, while the four stars represent the four original territories of modern Johor: Johor Bahru, Muar, Batu Pahat and Endau.

Supporters
The arms features two supporters depicted by rampant tigers, which represents the two Johor tigers, Dengkis and Tepuk, which according to folklore are the mystical guardians of Johor.

Compartment and motto
The area below the shield include of a group of yellow, mirrored flora (compartment) hanging a blue scroll (motto). The compartment represents gambir and black pepper, crops cultivated by Johor's traditional agricultural industry. The scroll, with text written in Jawi, reads Kepada Allah Berserah (Submit to Allah).

City, district and municipal coat of arms
All local governments have their own coat of arms, and like the state coat of arms, each of these features state symbols such as the two tigers and the royal crown of Johor or a crescent and mullet.

References 

Johor
Johor
Johor
Johor
Johor
Johor
Johor
Johor